Ryan Kinne (born August 31, 1989 in Waterbury, Connecticut, United States) is a former American soccer player.

Career

College and amateur
Kinne played his college career at Monmouth University where he was an NSCAA All-American, Hermann Trophy semi-finalist and Northeast Conference player of the year in both his Junior and Senior seasons. In 77 career games, he scored 35 goals, including 12 as a senior in 2010. He also added 21 assists, including six as a senior.

Kinne also played in for Central Jersey Spartans in the USL Premier Development League during their inaugural season.

Professional
On January 14, 2011, Kinne was drafted in the third round (#42 overall) in the 2011 MLS SuperDraft by the New England Revolution. He signed with the club on March 3, 2011. Kinne made his professional debut for the New England Revolution on March 26, 2011, coming on as a 90th-minute substitute in a 2-1 win over D.C. United

Kinne was waived by New England on March 5, 2012.

Kinne signed with USL Premier Development League club Connecticut FC Azul on March 27, 2012.

On February 15, 2013 Kinne moved back to a professional level when he signed for USL Pro club Pittsburgh Riverhounds.

He is currently the head coach of the Naugatuck High School boys soccer team, a position he has held since 2016

References

External links
 
 New England Soccer Today Feature
 Monmouth Profile

1989 births
Living people
American soccer players
Monmouth Hawks men's soccer players
Central Jersey Spartans players
New England Revolution players
AC Connecticut players
Pittsburgh Riverhounds SC players
USL League Two players
Major League Soccer players
USL Championship players
New England Revolution draft picks
Sportspeople from Waterbury, Connecticut
Soccer players from Connecticut
All-American men's college soccer players
Association football forwards